Ben Berlin (born Hermann Biek; 1896–1944) was a jazz musician born in Reval (now Tallinn, Estonia) in 1896. He married composer Vera Vinogradova around 1920 and they had two children, Leopold and Nina. Berlin founded the Ben Berlin Dance Orchestra in Germany in 1928, producing records with Deutsche Grammophon such as "Küss mich und morgen vergiss mich" and "Roses of Yesterday". As a Jew, he left Nazi Germany in 1933, moving to Holland, Austria, France and finally England where he died in 1944, sitting at his desk.

References

External links
Ben Berlin Playlist on Youtube

1896 births
1944 deaths
Musicians from Tallinn
People from the Governorate of Estonia
Estonian Jews
German jazz bandleaders
20th-century conductors (music)
20th-century German musicians
German emigrants to Austria
Jewish emigrants from Nazi Germany to the Netherlands
Jewish emigrants from Nazi Germany to France
Jewish emigrants from Nazi Germany to the United Kingdom
German emigrants to England